This is a list of official Dungeons & Dragons adventures published by Wizards of the Coast as separate publications. It does not include adventures published as part of supplements, officially licensed Dungeons & Dragons adventures published by other companies, official d20 System adventures and other Open Game License adventures that may be compatible with Dungeons & Dragons.

Officially published adventures from before 3rd edition are often called modules. For a list of modules published prior to 3rd Edition Adventures, see List of Dungeons & Dragons modules. For description and history of Adventures/Modules, see Adventure (D&D).  For adventures set in the Forgotten Realms setting, see the List of Forgotten Realms modules and sourcebooks, and for adventures set in the Eberron setting, see the List of Eberron modules and sourcebooks.



3rd edition
The adventures listed here are official Wizards of the Coast Dungeons & Dragons 3/3.5 adventures only.  The first 3rd Edition adventure module published (not counting OGL/d20 STL modules) by Wizards of the Coast was The Sunless Citadel, in 2000.

Additionally Wizards published a series of Free Online Adventures on their website from 2000 to 2005. This is the complete list of adventures, with links to the original presentation articles.

4th edition
The first official Wizards of the Coast 4th edition adventure published was Keep on the Shadowfell in 2008.

H series
H—Heroic tier adventures were designed for characters of level 1–10. This series can stand alone, or can be used before the P series and E series to begin a campaign from 1st to 30th level, focusing on the cult of the demon prince Orcus.

HS series
HS—Heroic Standalone tier adventures were designed for characters of level 1–10. Adventures in this series were designed to be used stand alone and not as part of a multi-adventure campaign.

P series
P—Paragon tier adventures were designed for characters of level 11–20. This series can stand alone, or can be used in between the H series and E series to continue a campaign from 1st to 30th level, focusing on the cult of the demon prince Orcus.

E series
E—Epic tier adventures were designed for characters of level 21–30. This series can stand alone, or can be used following the H series and P series to conclude a campaign from 1st to 30th level, focusing on the cult of the demon prince Orcus.

Other

Essentials
These adventures were included in the boxed sets of the Essentials line.

5th edition

Adventures

Boxed sets

See also
 List of Dungeons & Dragons modules – for adventure modules up until the publication of 3rd Edition D&D

Notes

References

Dungeons and Dragons adventures
Dungeons and Dragons adventures

fr:Liste des aventures de Donjons et Dragons